The Chinese Aviation Museum, sometimes referred to as the China Aviation Museum and the Datangshan Aviation Museum (due to its location adjacent to the mountain of the same name), is an aviation museum in Changping District, Beijing, China. The museum was first opened to the public on 11 November 1989, to celebrate the 40th anniversary of the founding of the People's Liberation Army Air Force.

Part of the museum is located inside a cave in the side of Datangshan Mountain. The road leading to the museum is actually also used as a taxiway between the base and bunker system.

Collection
There are more than 200 aircraft on display, with an emphasis on the Korean War and the Cold War. The collection includes many unique machines, including a 1903 Wright Flyer replica.

Aircraft on display include:
Aérospatiale Alouette III helicopter
Bell UH-1H Huey helicopter
de Havilland Canada DHC-2 Beaver
de Havilland Mosquito
Douglas DC-8-21 (N220RB) once used by ORBIS International for eye surgery from 1982 to 1994
Fairchild PT-19
Harbin Z-5
Harbin/CHDRI Z-6
Hawker Siddeley Trident
Ilyushin Il-18V four-engine turbo-prop transport that was Mao Zedong's personal VIP aircraft
Ilyushin Il-2 Shturmovik
Lavochkin La-11
Lenin biplane
Lisunov Li-2
Lockheed D-21 Mach 3+ reconnaissance drone
Lockheed F-104 Ex Italian Air Force
Martin RB-57D Canberra
MiG-9
MiG-17 fighter (Cut-away)
MiG-23 Ex Egypt Air Force
Mil Mi-4
Mil Mi-8
Mil Mi-24
Nanchang A-5
Nanchang CJ-5
Nanchang CJ-6
Nanchang J-12
Nanjing Aviation College AD200 canard ultralight two seater student project sport aircraft
North American P-51 Mustang
North American F-86 Ex Pakistan Air Force
Northrop F-5E
Northrop F-5F
Shenyang F-5
Shenyang F-6
Shenyang F-7
Tachikawa Ki-55
Tupolev Tu-2
Tupolev Tu-124
Vickers Viscount
Yakovlev Yak-11
Yakovlev Yak-17UTI
Many bombs, guns and radar systems

See also
List of aerospace museums

References

External links

 Chinese Aviation Museum homepage 
 Datangshan info and links

Aerospace museums in China
Air force museums
Museums in Beijing
Transport museums in China
Military and war museums in China
Changping District
National first-grade museums of China